Hurricane Greta, later Hurricane Olivia, was one of fourteen named Atlantic hurricanes to cross over Central America into the eastern Pacific while remaining a tropical cyclone. The seventh named storm of the 1978 Atlantic hurricane season, Greta formed from a tropical wave just northwest of Trinidad on September 13, and despite being in a climatologically unfavorable area, gradually intensified while moving west-northwestward. On September 16, it became a hurricane south of Jamaica. Two days later, the well-defined eye approached northeastern Honduras but veered to the northwest. After reaching peak winds of  that day, Greta weakened while paralleling the northern Honduras coast just offshore. On September 19, it made landfall on Belize near Dangriga and quickly weakened into a tropical depression while crossing Guatemala and southeastern Mexico. After entering the eastern Pacific, the system re-intensified into a hurricane and was renamed Olivia, the eighteenth named storm of the 1978 Pacific hurricane season which weakened before landfall and dissipated over Chiapas on September 23.

Taking a similar path to Hurricane Fifi four years prior, Greta threatened to reproduce the devastating effects of the catastrophic storm; however, damage and loss of life was significantly less than feared. In Honduras, about 1,200 homes were damaged, about half of which in towns along the coastline. The storm damaged about 75% of the houses on Roatán along the offshore Bay Islands, and there was one death in the country. In the Belize Barrier Reef, Greta downed trees and produced high waves, while on the mainland, there was minimal flooding despite a high storm surge. In Dangriga where it made landfall, the hurricane damaged or destroyed 125 houses and the primary hospital. In Belize City, a tornado flipped over a truck and damaged four houses. Damage in Belize was estimated at $25 million (1978 USD), and there were four deaths.

Meteorological history

A tropical wave exited the west coast of Africa near Dakar, Senegal on September 7. Moving westward across the Atlantic Ocean, the wave spawned an area of convection three days later, which gradually organized. Though located in a climatologically unfavorable area, the depression intensified and continued to develop. A hurricane hunter on September 14 indicated that the depression intensified into Tropical Storm Greta to the north of the Netherlands Antilles.

After becoming a tropical storm, Greta intensified slowly due to a strong trough to the northwest, and with the South American coastline located to the south, the southerly inflow was disrupted. With a ridge to the north along the 30th parallel, the storm moved quickly west-northwestward across the Caribbean. Shortly thereafter, the trough to the northwest weakened, which had been preventing the storm's intensification. An increasingly well-defined eye developed while approaching the coast of Honduras as the barometric pressure quickly dropped. Early on September 18, the eyewall passed just offshore Cabo Gracias a Dios, the sparsely populated border between Honduras and Nicaragua The NHC described the eye as having "literally ricocheted off of the protruding northeast coast of Honduras", thus sparing much of the country from the strongest winds. This made it a Category 4 hurricane on the Saffir–Simpson scale.

Despite the proximity to land, Greta initially maintained a well-defined structure. The hurricane continued generally west-northwestward due to the ridge to the north, and initially was expected to enter the Bay of Campeche. The calm of the eye was reported for three to five minutes there. Rapidly weakening over land, the hurricane deteriorated to tropical depression status over Guatemala within 12 hours of landfall. A large high pressure area from the Carolinas to the central Gulf of Mexico turned Greta southwestward toward the eastern Pacific Ocean. Soon after, the depression emerged over the warm waters of the eastern Pacific and re-intensified. At 06:00 UTC, the depression re-attained tropical storm status and named Olivia by the EPHC. After initially moving to the north, Olivia began executing a slow counterclockwise loop. Based on observations from nearby ships and radar, it is estimated Olivia attained minimal hurricane status early on September 22. Early on September 23, Olivia dissipated over the Mexican state of Chiapas.

Hurricane Greta–Olivia was a rare crossover storm from the Atlantic to the Pacific, one of only fourteen named storms to maintain tropical cyclone status during the crossing.

Impact

Early in its duration, Greta produced heavy rainfall in the Netherlands Antilles, but the strongest winds remained north of the island.

Late on September 17 when Greta's eye was just offshore Honduras, the country's government issued a hurricane warning for the eastern coastline. Around the same time, the Mexican government issued a hurricane warning for the eastern Yucatán peninsula, and on September 18 a hurricane warning was issued for the Belize and Guatemala coastlines. These advanced warnings helped reduce fatalities. In Puerto Castilla, Honduras, about 2,000 people were evacuated in advance of the storm. The Honduran government put its military, police, and Red Cross on standby in advance of the storm, due to fears of a repeat of Hurricane Fifi in 1974. However, unlike Fifi, which caused deadly floods in the region four years prior and took a similar track, Greta did not cause as significant river flooding in Honduras.

Across much of Greta's track in Central America, the hurricane dropped locally heavy rainfall. Winds along the northern Honduras coast were diminished due to the eyewall passing to the north. Many villages were isolated and communication with them was severely hampered. In Puerto Lempira, roughly 1,500 of the town's 7,000 residents sought refuge in five large structures during the storm. In twelve communities along the coastline, military officials reported that 656 homes were destroyed, of which 278 were in Punta Potuca. In the offshore Bay Islands, the hurricane destroyed 26 houses on Guanaja, where many roofs were lost and several boats were destroyed. There was one death in Honduras, and nationwide, the hurricane damaged about 1,200 homes, washed out roads and bridges, and wrecked coconut and rice crops.

On the offshore Ambergris Caye, winds reached , and there was heavy rainfall. On Half Moon Caye, the hurricane damaged the base of a lighthouse and knocked over several coconut trees. Along the Belize Barrier Reef, the hurricane downed palm trees and produced high waves, with significant wave heights of about  along Carrie Bow Caye. The strong winds destroyed 50 houses there and unroofed a further 75, including damage to the hospital. There were also disruptions to power and water service. About 90% of the grapefruit crop was destroyed, and 50% of the orange crop was lost. The United States embassy was flooded with about one foot of mud. There was little damage in the city, although a tornado in Belize City that damaged four houses and flipped over a truck. During the storm, the Belize International Airport was closed. Farther inland, strong winds caused heavy damage at Guanacaste National Park. Damage throughout Belize was estimated at $25 million (1978 USD), and there were four deaths. Three of the deaths were on offshore islands in areas without radios, and the other was due to electrocution.

Aftermath
Following the storm damage in Honduras, the country requested help from the United States. The aid was distributed by the Military of Honduras.

In late October 1978, the United Methodist Church sent books and other supplies via aircraft to Belize, after a youth group rode out the storm there and desired to help residents. Despite the hurricane damage, the economy of Belize continued to grow after Greta struck, including an increase in banana production.

The World Meteorological Organization and the National Hurricane Center list Greta in the retired hurricane name list.

See also

 Other storms named Greta
 Other storms named Olivia
 List of Atlantic–Pacific crossover hurricanes
 List of Category 4 Atlantic hurricanes
 List of Category 1 Pacific hurricanes
 Hurricane Edith (1971) – a Category 5 hurricane that rapidly intensified while approaching Cape Gracias a Dios
 Hurricane Fifi-Orlene (1974) – A disastrous Category 2 hurricane in that caused catastrophic flooding in Honduras, before crossing into the Pacific and regenerating into a Category 2 hurricane again
 Hurricane Irene-Olivia (1971) - A Category 3 hurricane with the same East Pacific basin name, crossed over from Atlantic to the Pacific

References

External links

Greta-Olivia
Greta-Olivia
Greta-Olivia
Greta-Olivia
Greta-Olivia
Greta-Olivia
Greta-Olivia
Greta-Olivia
Greta-Olivia
Greta-Olivia
Hurricane Greta-Olivia
Retired Atlantic hurricanes